The women's heptathlon event at the 1983 Summer Universiade was held at the Commonwealth Stadium in Edmonton, Canada with the final on 6 and 7 July 1983.

Results

References

Athletics at the 1983 Summer Universiade
1983